The 1929 Grand National was the 88th renewal of the world-famous Grand National horse race that took place at Aintree Racecourse near Liverpool, England, on 22 March 1929.

It had the largest starting field of any Aintree Grand National with 66 horses taking part in the race.

The race was won by 100/1 outsider Gregalach, and it was the second successive year where a horse with such odds won. Fourth-placed Melleray's Belle started at odds of 200/1 and was the first horse with odds as wide as this to finish in the top four places since Magpie, also a 200/1 bet in 1886.

Gregalach was ridden by jockey Robert W. H. Everett and trained by Tom Leader, for owner Margaret Gemmell. Easter Hero, the favourite, finished in second place and Richmond II was third.

Of the 66 runners, all but one returned safely to the stables. One horse, named Stort, incurred a leg fracture in a fall and was euthanised.

Finishing order

Non-finishers

Media coverage and aftermath
The media largely praised Aintree's decision to fill in the ditch at The Canal Turn in the wake of the pile up that happened there the previous year but the sheer volume of entries again led to criticism, despite Aintree having introduced an additional forfeit stage in the conditions. The Hon George Lambton claimed that the conditions of the race encouraged poor horses to be entered and that the framing of the weights was also unfair and that the top weights should not be forced to burden as much as 35lbs more than those at the foot of the handicap. Aintree responded the following year by increasing the minimum entry age from five to six years, though changes to the handicap remained unaltered until 1960.

References

 1929
Grand National
Grand National
20th century in Lancashire